Jung District (literally central district) is a gu in southern central Ulsan, South Korea.  Its name literally means "Central Ward".  Most of the population live between the southern border of the River Taehwa and Ring Road. The current head of the district is Park Sung-min (Hangul: 박성민) (2018).

Demographics
234,875 people live in Ulsan Jung-gu. 120,077 of these are Korean males, 114,349 are Korean females, 153 are foreign males and 296 are foreign females (30 April 2003).  In only one "dong" (smaller division), namely Okgyo-dong, do women outnumber men.  More details can be found in the Administrative Divisions section.

Administrative divisions
The "Dong" of Jung-gu and their demographics are as follow:
Bangu 1-dong (Hangul: 반구1동) 10,292 km; 9,357 KF; 11 FM; 24 FF
Bangu 2-dong (Hangul: 반구2동) 5,493 km; 5,165 KF; 6 FM; 6 FF
Boksan 1-dong (Hangul: 복산1동) 6,712 km; 6,319 KF; 9 FM; 14 FF
Boksan 2-dong (Hangul: 복산2동) 6,708 km; 6,383 KF; 8 FM; 12 FF
Bukjeong-dong (Hangul: 북정동) 6,194 km; 6,030 KF; 9 FM; 16 FF
Byeongyeong 1-dong (Hangul: 병영1동) 10,733 km; 10,264 KF; 5 FM; 21 FF
Byeongyeong 2-dong (Hangul: 병영2동) 11,113 km; 10,246 KF: 12 FM; 21 FF
Daun-dong (Hangul: 다운동) 16,616 km; 15,986 KF; 15 FM; 17 FF
Hakseong-dong (Hangul: 학성동) 7,314 km; 6,796 KF; 8 FM; 13 FF
Okgyo-dong (Hangul: 옥교동) 4,318 km; 4,341 KF; 10 FM; 29 FF
Seongnam-dong (Hangul: 성남동) 4,013 km; 3,937 KF; 11 FM; 45 FF
Taehwa-dong (Hangul: 태화동) 13,634 km; 13,274 KF; 9 FM; 30 FF
Ujeong-dong (Hangul: 우정동) 13,201 km; 12,861 KF; 36 FM; 44 FF
Yaksa-dong (Hangul: 약사동) 3,736 km; 3,390 KF; 4 FM; 4 FF

Key
KM: Resident Korean Males
KF: Resident Korean Females
FM: Resident Foreign Males
FF: Resident Foreign Females

Local attractions
Ulsan City centre is generally regarded as Seongnam-dong, in central Jung-gu.  Here lies Dongheon (Hangul: 동헌), an old complex used by the Japanese as a base of government during the occupation of Korea.  Also in Jung-gu are Hyanggyo (Hangul: 향교), the old Confucian Academy, Byeongyeongseong (Hangul: 병영성), an old hill fortress of which very little remains today, and an ancient stupa atop the hill known as Hakseong Park (Hangul: 학성공원).  This stupa is the only one in South Korea to have the Oriental Zodiac figures carved around its base. Ulsan Central Market, the largest traditional market in Ulsan is located in Jung-gu.

See also
List of districts in South Korea

References

External links
Official site 
Official site